Heather Douglas, a graduate of New Albany High School (New Albany, Indiana) has appeared in Broadway productions of Tommy Tunes's The Will Rogers Follies and Crazy for You, the pre-Broadway tour of Jekyll and Hyde, a national tour and Berlin production of Crazy for You, as Audrey in Little Shop of Horrors, Rapunzel in Into the Woods, Cassie in A Chorus Line, Nickie in Sweet Charity, in Disney MGM Studio's Beauty and the Beast, the original West End theatre production of Chicago, where she understudied and played the part of Velma, My One and Only in both London and Chichester, where she also understudied and played Edythe, and Cats as Bombalurina.

Additional credits include associate choreographer for the musical Beautiful and Damned (Yvonne Arnaud Theater, Guildford), assistant director/choreographer for Copacabana (2003) in Denmark and Holland, Chess (2002) in Denmark, associate choreographer for My One and Only in Chichester and London, Calamity Jane the UK tour and Shaftsbury Theatre in London, Il Trovatore in Rotterdam and JFK The Musical in Dublin. She has choreographed several musicals in the US including Anything Goes, Gypsy and Unsung Cole and in the UK Cabaret, The Threepenny Opera and Jill and the Beanstalk.

Her television credits include Showtime at the Stadium for the BBC, The Monkees music video for MTV, Disney MGM Studio's Opening Special, Disney's Macey's Parade and Agony for UK Living. Film credits include De-Lovely (2004) starring Ashley Judd and Kevin Kline.

External links

American musical theatre actresses
Living people
Year of birth missing (living people)
21st-century American actresses